Norbert Farkas may refer to:
 Norbert Farkas (alpine skier) (born 1992), Hungarian alpine skier
 Norbert Farkas (footballer born 1977), Hungarian footballer
 Norbert Farkas (footballer born 1992), Hungarian footballer